Federal Highway 162 (Carretera Federal 162) is a Federal Highway of Mexico. The highway travels from Tepoztlán, Morelos in the east to Cuernavaca in the west. In Tepoztlán, the highway continues south to Yautepec as a Morelos state highway. Federal Highway 162 is an important connector route from Cuernavaca to El Tepozteco National Park and Tepoztlán, itself a popular tourist destination in Morelos that is an official Pueblo Mágico as designated by the federal government.

References

 

145
Morelos
Cuernavaca